Ward Greene (December 23, 1892 – January 22, 1956) was an American writer, editor, journalist, playwright, and general manager of the comic syndicate King Features Syndicate. He is known for overseeing the works of Alex Raymond and other writers and artists at King Features Syndicate, as well as writing Raymond's Rip Kirby comic strip from 1946 until his death.

Greene wrote the magazine story "Happy Dan, the Cynical Dog" for Cosmopolitan in 1945, and this story was the basis for the 1955 Walt Disney film Lady and the Tramp. Greene also wrote the spinoff comic strip, Scamp, featuring the young son of the Disney dogs, from 1955 to 1956.

Biography 
Greene was born in Asheville, North Carolina, in 1892. One of his ancestors was Gen. Nathanael Greene of the Continental Army, one of George Washington's most gifted and trusted officers.

Greene was raised in Atlanta, Georgia, and later attended the Sewanee: The University of the South.

His first job was in 1913 for The Atlanta Journal as an assistant sports editor. Staying at The Journal for ten years, he moved from sports to the police beat to finally become the paper's star reporter. He covered the trial and subsequent lynching of Leo Frank after his conviction for the murder of Mary Phagan in 1913. After a stint at the New-York Tribune in 1917, in 1918–1919 he went to the battlefields of France to cover the Great War for The Atlanta Journal from the perspective of Georgian troops.

Greene joined the Hearst Corporation in 1920, became a writer and editor of the magazine section in 1925, advancing to executive editor, and to general manager in 1946. 

He wrote articles for The American Mercury from 1925 to 1931. His first novel, Cora Potts, was published in 1929. Greene's book Death in the Deep South (Avon Publications, 1936) was a fictionalized account of the Leo Frank case. According to reviewer William Rose Benét, Death in the Deep South "reveals with startling clarity how the law works and how the press works after a particularly horrible and brutal murder." It was adapted as the film They Won't Forget in 1937.

Greene's "Happy Dan, the Cynical Dog" (Cosmopolitan magazine, 1945) was the basis for Walt Disney's animated film Lady and the Tramp (1955). King Features immediately spun off "Scamp," a minor unnamed character from the movie, into his own comic strip, written by Greene and illustrated by Dick Moores. Scamp was soon taken over by other creators, but lasted more than 30 years, until 1988. 

Greene also wrote under the pseudonyms Frank Dudley and Jean Greene.

A resident of Westwood, New Jersey, Greene died in Havana, Cuba, of a pulmonary edema brought on by pneumonia while en route to a family vacation in California.

Bibliography

Books 
 Cora Potts: A Pilgrim's Progress. Cape, 1929
 Ride the Nightmare. Cape, 1930. Repr. as Life and Loves of a Modern Mister Bluebeard. Avon, 1930
 Weep No More. Smith, 1932
 (as Frank Dudley) The Havana Hotel Murders. Houghton Mifflin, 1936
 Death in the Deep South. Avon, 1936
 King Cobra. Carrick, 1940
 Route 28. Doubleday, 1940
 What They Don't Know: A Novel. Random House, 1944
 (as Jean Greene). The Forgetful Elephant. McKay, 1945
 Star Reporters and 34 of Their Stories. Random House, 1948
 Lady and the Tramp: The Story of Two Dogs. Simon, 1953
 (with Alex Raymond) Rip Kirby: The First Modern Detective. Complete Comic Strips 1948-1951. IDW Publishing, 2012.

Articles and short stories 
 "Is the Jelly Bean from Georgia?" [interview with F. Scott Fitzgerald]. 1923. Conversations with F. Scott Fitzgerald, ed. Matthew J. Bruccoli and Judith S. Baughman, UP of Mississippi, 2004, pp. 40–42
 "Notes for a History of the Klan." The American Mercury June 1925, pp. 240–43.
 "Boy for Tea." The American Mercury June 1930, pp. 223–27. Repr. Ellery Queen's Mystery Magazine July 1954, pp. 76–81
 "Rubber Stamp." The American Mercury Jan. 1930, pp. 109–12.
 "Caravan to Mecca." The American Mercury Mar. 1931, pp. 353–60
 "Happy Dan, the Cynical Dog." Cosmopolitan Feb. 1945, pp. 19–21

Plays 
 Honey. Prod. Cape Playhouse, Dennis, MA, 1938. Prod. Hilltop Theatre, Ellicott City, MD, 1940-41

References

1892 births
1956 deaths
American editors
20th-century American dramatists and playwrights
20th-century American novelists
American comics writers
Writers from Asheville, North Carolina
20th-century American male writers
Sewanee: The University of the South alumni
Disney comics writers
Deaths from pulmonary edema